Ganda is a town in Nagqu Prefecture in the Tibet Autonomous Region of China. 
It lies at an altitude of 12,750 ft (3,890 metres). The Dzogchen Monastery is nearby.

References

Populated places in Nagqu